Tony Was An Ex-Con is the second studio album released by the Irish indie act The Coronas, released 25 September 2009 by 3ú Records. A version of "Listen Dear" in Irish was also released, entitled "Éist a Ghrá".

Track listing
"Won't Leave You Alone" - 3:54
"Far From Here" - 4:14
"Someone Else's Hands" - 4:26
"Listen Dear" - 3:31
"This Is Not A Test" - 4:11
"Warm" - 3:53
"Tony Was An Ex-Con" - 3:09
"Point Me Towards The Sky" - 3:00
"Sandy" - 2:47
"Faith In Fate" - 4:34
"All The Luck In The World" - 4:13

2009 albums
The Coronas albums